Gahnite, ZnAl2O4, is a rare mineral belonging to the spinel group. It forms octahedral crystals which may be green, blue, yellow, brown or grey. It often forms as an alteration product of sphalerite in altered massive sulphide deposits such as at Broken Hill, Australia. Other occurrences include Falun, Sweden where it is found in pegmatites and skarns; and, in the United States, Charlemont, Massachusetts; Spruce Pine, North Carolina; White Picacho district, Arizona; Topsham, Maine; and Franklin, New Jersey.

It was first described in 1807 for an occurrence in the Falu mine, Falun, Dalarna, Sweden, and named after the Swedish chemist, Johan Gottlieb Gahn (1745–1818), the discoverer of the element manganese. It is sometimes called zinc spinel.

See also
 List of minerals named after people

References

Zinc minerals
Aluminium minerals
Spinel group
Cubic minerals
Minerals in space group 227
Minerals described in 1807